Mustafino (Mostafa) is a rural locality (a selo) and the administrative centre of Mustafinsky Selsoviet, Bakalinsky District, Bashkortostan, Russia. The population was 821 as of 2010. There are 8 streets.

Geography 
Mustafino is located 23 km southwest of Bakaly (the district's administrative centre) by road. Palchikovo is the nearest rural locality.

References 

Rural localities in Bakalinsky District